Mary Carroll Ellsberg (born 1958) is an American epidemiologist whose research focuses on global health and violence against women. She is the director of the Global Women's Institute at George Washington University in Washington D.C. Ellsberg is the daughter of Carol Cummings and the American military analyst and whistleblower, Daniel Ellsberg, and sister to Robert Ellsberg, the editor-in-chief and publisher of Orbis Books, and author Michael Ellsberg.

Education
Ellsberg received her bachelor's degree in Latin American studies from Yale University. In 2000, she obtained her Ph.D. in epidemiology and public health from Umeå University in Sweden, where she wrote a thesis on domestic violence against women in Nicaragua.

Nicaragua
In 1979 Ellsberg moved to Nicaragua to work for peace and social justice, and she lived there for almost 20 years. During this time she participated in the Nicaraguan Literacy Campaign and worked with vaccination and health consultation programs on the Caribbean coast for the Nicaragua Department of Health. Subsequently, in 1995 she did a prevalence study on domestic violence in Nicaragua, finding that 50% of women had been beaten or raped by their partner. This study was used to pass the country's first domestic violence law in 1996. In 2000, she defended her Ph.D. thesis at Umeå University on domestic violence in Nicaragua. After moving back to the United States, she has continued to conduct domestic violence research in Nicaragua.

United States
After returning to the United States, Ellsberg served as the vice president for research and programs at the International Center for Research on Women in Washington D.C. In 2012 she joined the faculty of George Washington University where she is the director of the Global Womens Institute.

Scientific research
Ellsberg has studied domestic violence against women around the world, including Nicaragua, Melanesia, and South Sudan. She was a member of the core research team of the World Health Organization's Multi-Country Study on Domestic Violence and Women's Health, which has compared ten different countries in terms of prevalence, risk factors and consequences of intimate partner violence.

Selected publications 
 Ellsberg M, Caldera T, Herrera A, Winkvist A, Kullgren G. Domestic violence and emotional distress among Nicaraguan women: Results from a population-based study. American Psychologist. 1999 Jan;54(1):30.
 Ellsberg MC, Pena R, Herrera A, Liljestrand J, Winkvist A. Wife abuse among women of childbearing age in Nicaragua. American journal of public health. 1999 Feb;89(2):241-4.
 Ellsberg M, Peña R, Herrera A, Liljestrand J, Winkvist A. Candies in hell: women's experiences of violence in Nicaragua. Social science & medicine. 2000 Dec 1;51(11):1595-610.
 Ellsberg M, Heise L, Pena R, Agurto S, Winkvist A. Researching domestic violence against women: methodological and ethical considerations. Studies in family planning. 2001 Mar;32(1):1-6.
 Garcia-Moreno C, Jansen HA, Ellsberg M, Heise L, Watts CH. Prevalence of intimate partner violence: findings from the WHO multi-country study on women's health and domestic violence. The Lancet. 2006 Oct 7;368(9543):1260-9.
 Ellsberg M, Jansen HA, Heise L, Watts CH, Garcia-Moreno C. Intimate partner violence and women's physical and mental health in the WHO multi-country study on women's health and domestic violence: an observational study. The Lancet. 2008 Apr 5;371(9619):1165-72.
 Abramsky T, Watts CH, Garcia-Moreno C, Devries K, Kiss L, Ellsberg M, Jansen HA, Heise L. What factors are associated with recent intimate partner violence? Findings from the WHO multi-country study on women's health and domestic violence. BMC public health. 2011 Dec;11(1):109.
 Ellsberg M, Arango DJ, Morton M, Gennari F, Kiplesund S, Contreras M, Watts C. Prevention of violence against women and girls: what does the evidence say?. The Lancet. 2015 Apr 18;385(9977):1555-66.
 Ellsberg M, Contreras M, No safe place: A lifetime of violence for conflict-affected women and girls in South Sudan, Global Women's Institute, 2017
  Ellsberg M, Ugarte W, Ovince J, et al. Long-term change in the prevalence of intimate partner violence: a 20-year follow-up study in León, Nicaragua, 1995-2016. BMJ Global Health 2020;5:e002339. doi:10.1136/bmjgh-2020-002339

External links 
 Google Scholar, Mary Ellsberg
 TEDxFoggyBottom, Mary Ellsberg, Ending violence against women with numbers and stories
 George Washington University  Global Women's Institute

References

Living people
American people of Jewish descent
Domestic violence academics
George Washington University faculty
Yale College alumni
Umeå University alumni
1958 births
American women epidemiologists
American epidemiologists